Once Upon a Time in Shanghai could refer to:

Once Upon a Time in Shanghai (1998 film), a 1998 Chinese film by Peng Xiaolian
Once Upon a Time in Shanghai (2014 film), a 2014 Hong Kong film by Wong Ching-po 
Once Upon a Time in Shanghai (TV series), a 1996 Hong Kong TV series